Lepidomeda is a genus of cyprinid fish, commonly known as the spinedaces, found in western North America. Of the four known species, one is extinct and two are threatened. They appear to be fairly close to the leatherside chub and the spikedaces (genus Meda), but the phylogeny and indeed the validity of the proposed "plagopterin" clade is insufficiently resolved.

Species 
The genus contains these species:
 Lepidomeda albivallis R. R. Miller & C. L. Hubbs, 1960 (White River spinedace)
 Lepidomeda aliciae (Jouy, 1881) southern leatherside chub 
 Lepidomeda copei(Jordan & Gilbert, 1881) northern leatherside chub 
 †Lepidomeda altivelis R. R. Miller & C. L. Hubbs, 1960 (Pahranagat spinedace)
 Lepidomeda mollispinis R. R. Miller & C. L. Hubbs, 1960 (virgin spinedace)
 Lepidomeda vittata Cope, 1874 (Little Colorado spinedace)

References